Csiribpuszta is a former village, now a part of Gárdony, Hungary. The postal code is 2484.

Geography 

Csiribpuszta's altitude is 150 meters.

It currently has a population of around 137 (in 2010).

It lies approximately 6,5 km south of Gárdony.

References

External links 
Csiribpuszta – Google Maps

Populated places in Fejér County